1915 The Armenian Files is an album by Roberto Paci Dalò, released in 2015 by Marsèll Records in collaboration with Giardini Pensili, Arthub (Shanghai/Hong Kong) and the Embassy of Armenia in Italy. It was recorded live in Vienna at the digital studio of the ORF (Austrian National Broadcasting Corporation) for the programme Kunstradio.

Background
1915 The Armenian Files is conceived about the Armenian genocide. Among the sound of the music, Daniel Varoujan's poems are narrated by Boghos Levon Zekiyan, also appearing the voice of the composer, religious and musicologist Komitas Vardapet. The record comes together with a movie, an exhibition, a radio broadcast, a multimedia concert.

Reception

The magazine Artribune places the album among the 25 best records of 2015. According to the magazine Neural, "in 1915 The Armenian Files a passionate and involved narrative is modulated by multiple influences and linkages, in an ultra-vivid junction of acoustic-electronic dramaturgy and immersive sensory perception".

-Fabrizio Zampighi, Sentireascoltare 10.01.2016

-Lello Voce, Il Fatto Quotidiano 28.06.2016.

Track listing

Personnel 
Roberto Paci Dalò – composition, clarinets, live electronics
Boghos Levon Zekiyan – narration (recorded in 2000)
Stefano Spada / Light Parade – beat design
Julia Kent – cello
Fabrizio Modonese Palumbo – electric guitar
Daniel Varoujan – texts

Credits
Sound Engineers: Elmar Peinelt, Markus Radinger
ORF Kunstradio Producer: Elisabeth Zimmermann
Mastered at La Maestà studio by Giovanni Versari
Julia Kent and Fabrizio Modonese Palumbo recorded at O.F.F. Studio in Turin, sound engineer: Paul Beauchamp
Produced by Roberto Paci Dalò and Mirko Rizzi
Production Marsèll, Giardini Pensili, Arthub, Ambasciata della Repubblica d'Armenia in Italia

References 

2015 live albums